Melrick Maddocks is a South African former field hockey player who competed in the 2017 Africa Cup of Nations.

He sister, Charné, also represents South Africa in field hockey.

References

External links

Living people
South African male field hockey players
1994 births